Barry Stevens may refer to:

 Barry Stevens (basketball) (1963–2007), American basketball player and coach
 Barry Stevens (cricketer) (born 1929), Australian cricketer
 Barry Stevens (technology developer) (born 1949), American scientist, author, business developer and entrepreneur
 Barry Stevens (therapist) (1902–1985), American Gestalt therapist
Barry Stevens (filmmaker) (born 1952), Canadian filmmaker